Gnishik is a village in the Areni Municipality of the Vayots Dzor Province in Armenia.

Nature  
Natural habitats vary from semi-desert to mountain steppes and meadows. The vicinity of Gnishik has been considered to be a Prime Butterfly Area, where a wide variety of rare butterflies, including Papilio alexanor, Colias chlorocoma, Pseudochazara schahrudensis, Tomares romanovi, Phengaris arion, and a number of others can be observed.

Municipal administration 
Gnishik was previously a community, which included the town of Mozrov, and had a combined population of 132 in 2011.

Notable residents 
Rouben Abrahamian

Gallery

References

External links 

 Butterfly Conservation Armenia: Gnishik PBA. http://www.butterfly-conservation-armenia.org/gnisheek.html

Populated places in Vayots Dzor Province